Juan Carlos Morrone also known as Giancarlo Morrone (born 5 February 1941) is an Argentine retired footballer and manager.

Career
Morrone played for Platense in his native Argentina, before moving to Lazio in Italy, following an impressive game-to-goal ratio in the Argentine football. Morrone played for Lazio in nine seasons overall, scoring 48 league goals for the club. He also had a stint in Fiorentina in the mid-1960s, before returning to Lazio once more.

References

1941 births
Living people
Argentine footballers
Argentine expatriate footballers
Serie A players
Serie B players
Club Atlético Platense footballers
ACF Fiorentina players
Calcio Foggia 1920 players
S.S. Lazio players
U.S. Avellino 1912 players
Expatriate footballers in Italy
S.S. Lazio managers
Expatriate football managers in Italy
Association football forwards
Argentine football managers
U.S. Catanzaro 1929 managers
Footballers from Buenos Aires